The story of Pan Zhang & Wang Zhongxian is first recorded in a Song Dynasty collection of tales called Anthology Of Tales From Records Of The Taiping Era. Text and story date back to the late Zhou or rather Warring States period. The kingdom of Chu as Pan Zhang's place of origin and that of Wu as Wang Zhongxian's native place are only archaic and literary references to present day Hunan and southern Jiangsu. This text has been misdated by Ameng from Wu, the compiler of On the Cut sleeve in 1909, and this error has gone unchecked ever since, including in Bret Hinsch's Passions of the Cut sleeve. Zhang Jie sets things right in his An ambiguous course, a History of homosexuality in Ancient China, p. 151 when he ascribes this story to the Three kingdoms and Six Dynasties period. The story states that "their love was like that between husband and wife".

It involves a beautiful writer named Pan Zhang who becomes widely known for his bearing and looks.  One of the male students who comes to learn from him is Wang Zhongxian, and the two fall in love at first sight.  They form a domestic partnership for the rest of their lives, during which they are described as "affectionate as husband and wife, sharing the same coverlet and pillow with unbounded intimacy for one another". Each of the couple dies at the same time, and the grieving local populace buries them at the peak of Mount Luofu. A tree miraculously grows from the spot, with its twigs growing to embrace each other.

See also
Achilles and Patroclus
David and Jonathan
Homosexuality in China
Same-sex marriage

References

Fictional gay males
LGBT in China
Fictional LGBT characters in literature